Rakovica is a settlement on the right bank of the Sava River northwest of Kranj in the Upper Carniola region of Slovenia.

References

External links

Rakovica on Geopedia

Populated places in the City Municipality of Kranj